In United States constitutional law, the Vesting Clauses are three provisions in the United States Constitution which vest legislative power in Congress, executive power in the President, and judicial power in the federal courts.

President Andrew Jackson interpreted these clauses as expressly creating a separation of powers among the three branches of the federal government.  In contrast, Victoria F. Nourse has argued that the Vesting Clauses do not create the separation of powers, and it actually arises from the representation and appointment clauses elsewhere in the Constitution.

Legislative Vesting Clause

Text
Article I, Section 1:

Executive Vesting Clause

Text
Article II, Section 1, Clause 1:

Judicial Vesting Clause

Text
Article III, Section 1:

See also

References

External links
List of popular names of sections and clauses of the US Constitution

Clauses of the United States Constitution